Élian Périz Toyas (born 1 April 1984) is a Spanish runner who specializes in the 800 metres. Her personal best time is 2:01.72, achieved in July 2015 in Madrid.

She was born in Huesca. She competed at the 2009 European Indoor Championships and the 2010 World Indoor Championships without reaching the final.

Achievements

References

1984 births
Living people
Spanish female middle-distance runners
Competitors at the 2011 Summer Universiade
People from Huesca
Sportspeople from the Province of Huesca
21st-century Spanish women